Na Bole Tum Na Maine Kuch Kaha is an Indian Hindi-language romantic drama television series that premiered on 9 January 2012 on Colors TV. It is digitally available on Voot. Produced by Sunshine Productions, it starred Kunal Karan Kapoor, Aakanksha Singh, Jayashree Venketaramanan and Kanwar Dhillon. It went off air on 12 September 2013.

Series overview

Plot

Megha Vyas, a young widow with two children, fights for justice to her late husband, Amar Vyas, who dies in a flyover collapse, which he is blamed for taking money and using low-quality material for construction. Mohan Bhatnagar, an honest man, works for a Hindi news company, Prabhat Leher. Soon, Megha and Mohan meet and hate each other due to misunderstandings. Mohan befriends Megha's daughter, Navika and the two share a bond.

Mohan collects evidence against Amar and produces it in front of the committee which was constituted to case of the flyover collapse. Soon, He learns that Amar is Megha's late husband and repents on finding Amar's innocence. Megha starts working in Prabhat Leher. Mohan exposes Dinanath, the real culprit behind the flyover collapse. Eventually, Mohan develops respect for Megha, her children and her in-laws. He realizes that he has fallen in love with her.

Megha and Mohan become friends. Mohan reveals his feelings for Megha. Megha initially rejects, but later accepts. Megha and Mohan get married with help of Megha's children and in-laws. Mohan's mother, Indu returns and unsuccessfully tries to ruin his marriage. Later, Megha and Mohan meet with an accident and Megha is paralyzed. Mohan takes care of her. Finally, Megha recovers and the family is happily reunited.

12 years later
Navika is grown up and works as a news reporter. The story regresses to 2001 and narrates the mystery of Megha's son, Aditya, who gets lost in the Indore railway station. Megha and Mohan had parted ways post Aditya's missing. Navika joins Mohan's newspaper and works there with hate toward Mohan. She finishes a political report of an illegal politician, Purushottam Singh Tilkadhari. His grandson, Beera Singh Tilkadhari, falls in love with Navika and helps her to reunite Mohan and Megha.

Aditya, who hates Mohan, is working to Tilakdharis' as Manoj. He introduces real Manoj, who is mentally thrown off, to Mohan as Aditya. Beera and Navika get married. Soon, Mohan learns that Manoj is the real Aditya, who got the latter arrested. After a while, Megha and others forgive him. Mohan takes his family for a picnic and topples from a high cliff. Before falling, Aditya holds Mohan, but leaves him to take revenge. Mohan is presumed to be dead.

2 years later
Megha takes Mohan's adopted daughter Rimjhim to Mumbai to find her real mother as wished by Rimjhim. Meanwhile, Mohan survived but has lost his memory. He lives as Vasu Rajvardhan who had been actually killed by latter step-mother, Aai. Soon, Megha meets Vasu and discovers that Vasu is Mohan and helps him to regain his memory. She exposes Aai. Aditya apologizes Megha and Mohan for his mistakes. Eventually, Mohan remembers his past. Finally, Megha and Mohan once again return to Indore and reunite to live happily forever.

Cast

Main
 Kunal Karan Kapoor as Mohan "Monu/Spiderman" Bhatnagar / Fake Vasu Rajvardhan – Star Reporter turned Editor of Chief; Indu and Arvind's son; Megha's second husband; Navika, Aditya and Rimjim's adoptive father (2012-2013)
 Aakanksha Singh as Megha Vyas Bhatnnagar – Amar's widow; Mohan's second wife; Navika and Aditya's mother; Rimjim's adoptive mother (2012-2013)
 Jayashree Venketaramanan as Navika "Nanhi" Bhatnagar Tilakdari – Star Reporter; Megha and Amar's daughter; Mohan's adopted daughter; Aditya's sister; Rimjhim's adoptive sister; Beera's wife (2013)
 Ashnoor Kaur as Child Navika Vyas Bhatnagar (2012)
 Kanwar Dhillon as Aditya "Addu" Bhatnagar / Fake Manoj – Megha and Amar's son; Mohan's adopted son; Navika's brother; Rimjhim's adoptive brother; Ragini's husband (2013)
Vishesh Bansal / Shivansh Kotia as Child Aditya Vyas Bhatnagar (2012)
 Reem Sheikh as Rimjhim Bhatnagar – Naina's daughter; Megha and Mohan's adopted daughter; Navika and Aditya's adopted sister (2013)

Recurring
 Dushyant Wagh as Gurucharan "Guru" Brijwasi – Mohan's brother-figure (2012-2013)
 Siddharth Arora as Beera Tilakdari – Purushottam's grandson; Ragini's brother; Navika's husband (2013)
 Pallavi Gupta as Ragini Tilakdhari Bhatnagar – Purushottam's granddaughter; Beera's sister; Aditya's wife (2013)
 Rohit Bhardwaj as Amar Vyas – Vedkant and Saroj's younger son; Sanjay's brother; Megha's late husband; Navika and Aditya's father (2012) (dead)
 Madhuri Sanjeev as Bela Vyas – Vedkant's sister; Megha's well-wisher; Tanmay, Navika and Aditya's grandaunt (2012-2013)
 Anjan Srivastav as Vedkant Vyas – Saroj's husband; Sanjay and Amar's father; Tanmay, Navika and Aditya's grandfather (2012-2013)
 Madhuri Bhandiwdekar as Saroj Vyas – Vedkant's wife; Sanjay and Amar's mother; Tanmay, Navika and Aditya's grandmother (2012-2013)
 Rinku Karmarkar as Renu Vyas – Sanjay's wife; Tanmay's mother (2012-2013)
 Sachin Parikh as Sanjay Vyas – Vedkant and Saroj's elder son; Amar's brother; Renu's husband; Tanmay's father (2012)
 Akhlaque Khan as Tanmay "Tannu" Vyas – Renu and Sanjay's son; Navika and Aditya's cousin; Arati's husband (2013)
 Nirav Soni as Teenage Tanmay Vyas (2012)
 Bhamini Oza as Arati Vyas – Tanmay's wife (2013)
 Manish Gandhi as Manoj aka Munna / Fake Aditya Bhatnagar – Disabled man who impersonates Aditya (2013)
 Khalid Siddiqui as Manav Chaturvedi – Renu's cousin; Megha's proposed groom (2012)
 Neelu Kohli as Indu Bhatnagar – Arvind's wife; Mohan's mother (2012)
 Vikram Kapadia as Arvind Bhatnagar – Indu's husband; Mohan's father (2012)
 Karan Thakur (actor) as Guddu Khatri (2012)
 Navina Bole as Koel – Dinanath's girlfriend (2012)
 Ankush Bali as Karan – Mohan's friend; reporter at Prabhat Leher (2012)
 Prinal Oberoi as Ridhima Bhatnagar – Mohan's ex-wife (2012)
 Puneet Panjwani as Prateek Agarwal – Prerna's husband (2012)
 Geeta Bisht as Prerna Agarwal – Prateek's wife; Megha's childhood friend (2012)
 Mehendi Jain as Nidhi – Chanchal's daughter (2012)
 Shabnam Pandey as Dimpy – Prateek and Prerna's relative (2012)
 Pooja Kanwal Mahtani as Rashmi Bharadwaj – Mohan's ex- girlfriend (2012)
 Karan Suchak as Gautam (2012)
 Shilpa Mehta as Rukmini Bharadwaj (2012)
 Anil Rastogi as Purushottam Singh Tilakdhari – Beera and Ragini's grandfather (2013)
 Aradhana Uppal as Anupama Sachdeva - Navika's boss (2013)
 Bharti Patil as Aai – Vasu's step-mother (2013)
 Nupur Alankar as Jyotiba Vaidya – Megha and Rijhim's landlady in Mumbai; Shridhar's wife; Rukku's mother (2013)
 Lalit Parimoo as Shridhar Vaidya – Jyotiba's husband; Rukku's father (2013)
 Aasiya Kazi as Rukku Vaidya – Shridhar and Jyotiba's daughter (2013)
 Jatin Sharma as Bala – Vasu's friend (2013)
 Preeti Puri as Naina Bhosle (fake) – Rijhim's fake mother (2013)

Guests
 Drashti Dhami as Madhubala Kundra from Madhubala – Ek Ishq Ek Junoon
 Dipika Kakar as Simar Bharadwaj from Sasural Simar Ka
 Tina Datta as Ichcha from Uttaran

Reviews
The show was a huge success among the masses. It received positive reviews for its interesting protagonists and engaging storyline, that is different from other soaps. The first season aired on 9 January 2012 and ended on 5 October 2012 due to Bigg Boss 6. The second season aired on 14 Jan,2013 and ended on 12 Sept,2013.

Adaptations

Awards

References

External links
 Official webpage at colors.com

Indian drama television series
Colors TV original programming
2012 Indian television series debuts
2013 Indian television series endings
Indian television soap operas